Falx may refer to:
Falciform ligament, a ligament of the liver
Falx, a sickle, scythe or sickle-like weapon used by Dacians
Falx cerebelli and falx cerebri, two parts of the dura mater of the brain
Foramen ovale (heart), a fetal cardiac shunt, also called the falx septi
Nu Persei
Conjoint tendon, a sickle-shaped tendon of the transversus abdominis muscle, also called the inguinal aponeurotic falx